Edward McBain was a Scottish footballer, who played for St Mirren and Scotland.

References

Sources

External links

London Hearts profile (Scotland)
London Hearts profile (Scottish League)

Year of birth missing
Place of birth missing
Scottish footballers
Scotland international footballers
St Mirren F.C. players
Association football wing halves
Scottish Football League players
Scottish Football League representative players
Year of death missing
Place of death missing
Footballers from Paisley, Renfrewshire